Brentwood School may refer to:
Brentwood College School, Mill Bay, British Columbia, Canada
Brentwood School, Essex, England
Brentwood School (Los Angeles), California, United States
Brentwood School (Sandersville), Georgia, United States
Brentwood Secondary College, Glen Waverley, Victoria, Australia

See also